The discography of Dover, a Spanish rock band, consists of eight studio albums, an extended play, two compilation albums, 28 singles, and 23 music videos.

During the middle of the 1990s, Dover released his first album, Sister, practically with no commercial success. It was not until his second album released in 1997, Devil Came to Me, when the band became famous. The album came to sell more than half a million copies worldwide, and the critics considered Dover the best group in the Spanish independent music scene. In 1999 they released their third album Late at Night, getting a triple platinum in February 2000. I Was Dead for 7 Weeks in the City of Angels is their fourth album, published in 2001, which achieved the number 1 on the Spanish sales list, selling over 125,000 discs in just over a week. A year later, in July 2002, they released their first EP, It's Good to Be Me!, with a total of eight songs, five live, two acoustic and one unreleased song: Mystic Love, which was single of this album. In 2003 they published the album The Flame, recorded entirely in Spain with the American producer Rick Will. This album sold about 50,000 copies in Spain and as many in Germany. In November 2005, Dover published in Japan its first compilation album titled Oh! Mother Russia, which contained the greatest hits from the last three studio albums. One year later, Dover gives a new, different and radical turn in his career with its album Follow the City Lights, published in 2006 with an imaginative blend of rock-electronic-dance-pop genres. In November 2007, Dover publishes a double compilation album titled 2, which contains the greatest hits in its electro pop version, plus a new song called Soldier. Its seventh studio album I Ka Kené would not be released until 2010, consisting of 10 songs sung in English, Bambara and French. This album was a commercial failure, selling just 5,000 copies. After a record five-year break, in 2015, the band from Madrid published a new album, Complications, leaving aside the electronic sound to return to their rocker roots. To date, Dover has sold nearly 2 million copies worldwide.

Albums

Studio albums

Compilation albums

Extended plays

Singles

Music videos

References

External links 
 

Dover (band)
Discographies of Spanish artists
Rock music group discographies
Alternative rock discographies